Harlan Hobart Grooms (November 7, 1900 – August 23, 1991) was a United States district judge of the United States District Court for the Northern District of Alabama.

Education and career
Born in Montgomery County, Kentucky, Grooms received a Bachelor of Laws from the University of Kentucky College of Law in 1926, and was in private practice in Birmingham, Alabama from 1926 to 1953. He was in the United States Army Reserve from 1926 to 1939, where he served in the 87th Infantry Division and rose to the rank of 1st Lieutenant.

Federal judicial service

On July 23, 1953, Grooms was nominated by President Dwight D. Eisenhower to a seat on the United States District Court for the Northern District of Alabama vacated by Judge Clarence H. Mullins. Grooms was confirmed by the United States Senate on July 31, 1953, and received his commission on August 3, 1953. He assumed senior status on February 3, 1969, serving in that capacity until his death on August 23, 1991.

Notable case

On July 1, 1955, Judge Grooms entered an order in the case of Lucy v. Adams, D.C., 134 F.Supp. 235, permanently enjoining the Dean of Admissions of the University of Alabama from denying African-American students the right to enroll therein and pursue courses of study thereat solely on account of their race or color.

References

Sources

1900 births
1991 deaths
20th-century American judges
20th-century American lawyers
Alabama lawyers
Alabama Republicans
Civil rights movement
Judges of the United States District Court for the Northern District of Alabama
Lawyers from Birmingham, Alabama
Military personnel from Kentucky
People from Montgomery County, Kentucky
United States Army officers
United States Army reservists
United States district court judges appointed by Dwight D. Eisenhower
University of Kentucky College of Law alumni